Wahlberg may refer to:

 Wahlberg (surname), including a list of people with the name
 Wahlberg's cormorant (bank cormorant, Phalacrocorax neglectus), a medium-sized cormorant
 Wahlberg's eagle (Aquila wahlbergi), a medium-sized raptor named after the Swedish naturalist Johan August Wahlberg
 Wahlberg's epauletted fruit bat (Epomophorus wahlbergi), a species of bat in the family Pteropodidae
 Wahlberg's honeybird (Prodotiscus regulus), a species of bird
 Wahlberg's Kalahari gecko (Pachydactylus wahlbergii), a species of reptile
 Wahlberg's velvet gecko (Homopholis wahlbergii), a species of reptile

See also
 Walburg (disambiguation)
 St. Walburg (disambiguation)
 Walberg, surname
 Wallburg (disambiguation)
 Wallberg (disambiguation)
 Wahlsburg, municipality in Germany